The Cartwright-Moss House is a historic house in Goodlettsville, Tennessee, USA.

History
The house was built as a log house by Jacob Cartwright, a settler, circa 1810s. It was expanded circa 1850.

Architectural significance
It has been listed on the National Register of Historic Places since August 1, 1979.

References

Houses in Davidson County, Tennessee
Houses on the National Register of Historic Places in Tennessee
Antebellum architecture
National Register of Historic Places in Davidson County, Tennessee